Nielex 'Lex' Tupas is a Filipino public servant. He was born in Iloilo City on August 11, 1979. He is the youngest son of the former deceased Iloilo Governor Niel Tupas (formerly a Municipal Mayor of Barotac Viejo, Iloilo; Assemblyman of Western Visayas or region VI; and was also Congressman of the 5th District of the Province of Iloilo) and former Municipal Mayor Myrna Causing Tupas of Barotac Viejo, Iloilo.

In the May 2007 local elections, he was elected as the youngest City Councilor at the age of 27 with about 73,000 votes. He was then re-elected twice as number 1 City Councilor of Iloilo City with more or less 93,000 votes (2010) and 125,000 votes (2013). He is currently the appointed Chief Operating Officer and Executive Director of the National Youth Commission of the Philippines.

Career

Tupas became one of the youngest teachers/lecturers in Iloilo City at age 25 when he was asked to be the Research and Economics consultant of Iloilo National High School. He was ranked as the number one teacher for School Year 2005-2006. He was also one of the youngest post-graduate degree professors of the Philippine Christian University, the St. Roberts International Academy and John B. Lacson Department of Information Technology at age 25.

He is a former board of director and Chairman of the Youth Leadership Excellence Awards of the Junior Chamber International Iloilo Chapter

He decided to transfer his residency in Iloilo City in 2005 and made a successful run as City Councilor. He obtained the biggest mandate for a first time candidate without any political background by obtaining 73,000 votes. 

He is the youngest official of the city who was elected citywide at age 27. He is also the first son of an incumbent provincial governor to have won a seat in the City of Iloilo and the first new resident of less than 2 years in the City on the day of the May 2007 elections to win a seat.

He is one of the youngest political party Chairmen. He is the City Chairman of UGYON Party
He is a radio anchor/newspaper columnist and Cable TV anchor

He has authored a number of meaningful legislative measures for the improvement and continued progress of Iloilo City and has initiated a number of innovative special programs and project that focus especially on children, the youth, women and the elderly.

Education 
He earned his Masters in Public Management major in Local Government Administration when he was only 27 years old and proceeded to earn his Doctor of Management with concentration in Public Management from the Central Philippine University at the age of 30.

References

External links
 Iloilo City Councilor profile

1979 births
Living people
Liberal Party (Philippines) politicians
Central Philippine University alumni
Central Philippine University people
People from Iloilo City
Filipino city and municipal councilors